DPRG can mean:
 Dallas Personal Robotics Group
 Digital Photogrammetry Research Group
 Distributed Protocols Research Group
 Drug Policy Review Group